Sericocomopsis is a genus of flowering plants belonging to the family Amaranthaceae.

Its native range is Northeastern and Eastern Tropical Africa.

Species:

Sericocomopsis hildebrandtii 
Sericocomopsis pallida

References

Amaranthaceae
Amaranthaceae genera